The Audie Award for Audiobook of the Year is one of the Audie Awards presented annually by the Audio Publishers Association (APA). It has been awarded since 2004.

Winners and finalists

2000s

2010s

2020s

References

External links 

 Audie Award winners
 Audie Awards official website

Audiobook of the Year
English-language literary awards
Awards established in 2004